Louis John Fellenz, Sr., (November 29, 1882January 1, 1953) was an American lawyer, politician, and judge from Wisconsin.  He was District Attorney of Fond du Lac County for four years, was a member of the Wisconsin State Senate, and was a Wisconsin Circuit Court Judge for the last nine years of his life.

Early life and career
Fellenz was born on November 29, 1882, in Ashford, Wisconsin, in Fond du Lac County. He attended school in Campbellsport, Wisconsin, before graduating from Oshkosh State Normal School in 1902.  He taught school for two years before attending the University of Wisconsin Law School, where he received his LL.B. in 1907.  He practiced law in Fort Atkinson for 3 years, then moved his practice to Fond du Lac.

Public office
In 1914 he was elected District Attorney of Fond du Lac County, running as a Republican.  He was re-elected in 1916, and left office in January 1919.  He returned to his law practice until 1928, when he was elected to represent Fond du Lac County in the Wisconsin State Senate for a four-year term.  In the senate, he was chairman of the interim committee on the courts, and also served on the committees on fire insurance and guardianship.  He was not a candidate for re-election in 1932.

Fellenz continued his law practice until he was appointed, in 1943, as a Wisconsin Circuit Court Judge for the Fond du Lac-based 18th Circuit, replacing the retiring Judge Clayton F. Van Pelt.  He was re-elected without opposition in 1947, but died in January 1853, before the end of his 2nd term.

Family and personal life

Louis Fellenz married Erma E. Tabor in 1914.  They had one son and two daughters, who all survived him.  His son, Louis J. Fellenz, Jr., also went on to serve as a member of the Senate, representing the same district as his father.

Fellenz was an avid hunter and golfer and a baseball enthusiast.

Electoral history

Wisconsin Senate (1928)

| colspan="6" style="text-align:center;background-color: #e9e9e9;"| General Election, November 6, 1928

Wisconsin Circuit Court (1947)

| colspan="6" style="text-align:center;background-color: #e9e9e9;"| General Election, April 1, 1947

References

Politicians from Fond du Lac, Wisconsin
Wisconsin state senators
District attorneys in Wisconsin
University of Wisconsin–Oshkosh alumni
University of Wisconsin Law School alumni
1882 births
1941 deaths
Burials in Wisconsin
20th-century American politicians